Wanlapa Jid-Ong  (born ) is a retired Thai female volleyball player, who played as a setter. 

She was part of the Thailand women's national volleyball team at the 1998 FIVB Volleyball Women's World Championship in Japan. and at the 2002 FIVB Volleyball Women's World Championship in Germany. On club level she played with Pepsi Bangkok.

Clubs
  Pepsi Bangkok (2002)

References

External links
http://www.fivb.ch/EN/Volleyball/Competitions/WorldChampionships/Women/2002/Teams/VB_Player.asp?No=13360
http://fivb.com/vis_web/volley/wwch2002/pdf/match034.pdf
http://www.sadec.com/Asiad98/news1209.html
http://www.alamy.com/stock-photo-miki-sasaki-of-japan-r-spikes-the-ball-over-wanlapa-jid-ong-of-thailand-118275301.html

1977 births
Living people
Wanlapa Jid-ong
Place of birth missing (living people)
Volleyball players at the 2002 Asian Games
Wanlapa Jid-ong
Wanlapa Jid-ong
Wanlapa Jid-ong